Ilfeld is an unincorporated community located in San Miguel County, New Mexico, United States. Ilfeld has a post office with ZIP code 87538.

References

Unincorporated communities in San Miguel County, New Mexico
Unincorporated communities in New Mexico